Deysla Marie Reyes Delgado (born 23 January 1993) is a Puerto Rican footballer who plays as a defender for the Puerto Rico women's national team.

Early life
Reyes was raised in Santurce, San Juan.

References

External links

1993 births
Living people
Women's association football defenders
Puerto Rican women's footballers
Sportspeople from San Juan, Puerto Rico
People from Santurce, Puerto Rico
Puerto Rico women's international footballers
Competitors at the 2010 Central American and Caribbean Games
College women's soccer players in the United States
Valdosta State University alumni